Leonardo Cuéllar Rivera (born 14 January 1954) is a Mexican football manager and former player who last acted as the manager of América in the Liga MX Femenil. He was the head coach of the Mexico women's national football team from 1998 to 2016.

Playing career

Club
Cuéllar played for Pumas and Atletas Campesinos in Mexico. He played in the NASL between 1979 and 1984 for the San Diego Sockers, San Jose Earthquakes and Golden Bay Earthquakes. He played for the Earthquakes during the NASL indoor seasons.

International
Cuéllar also represented the Mexico national football team 40 times, scoring 3 goals and participated at the 1978 FIFA World Cup.

Coaching

Personal life
He has an American-born son, Christopher Cuellar, who has coached Mexico women at under-17 and under-20 levels.

References

External links
 
 
 NASL/MISL career stats

1954 births
Living people
Footballers from Mexico City
Mexican footballers
Association football midfielders
Club Universidad Nacional footballers
San Diego Sockers (NASL) players
San Jose Earthquakes (1974–1988) players
Golden Bay Earthquakes (MISL) players
Liga MX players
Major Indoor Soccer League (1978–1992) players
North American Soccer League (1968–1984) indoor players
North American Soccer League (1968–1984) players
Olympic footballers of Mexico
Mexico international footballers
Footballers at the 1972 Summer Olympics
1978 FIFA World Cup players
CONCACAF Championship-winning players
Mexican expatriate footballers
Mexican expatriate sportspeople in the United States
Expatriate soccer players in the United States
Mexican football managers
Mexico women's national football team managers
Club América (women) managers
1999 FIFA Women's World Cup managers
2011 FIFA Women's World Cup managers
2015 FIFA Women's World Cup managers
Liga MX Femenil managers